The Evangelical Fellowship of Thailand is a national evangelical alliance, member of the World Evangelical Alliance. It regroup 2,729  evangelical churches, and various parachurch organizations, and foundations, and is one of five Christian groups legally recognized by the Thai government. The headquarters is in Bangkok, Thailand.

History
Following World War II, many evangelical missionary groups began missionary work in Thailand.   These varied evangelical groups worked independently from both the CCT and each other, but in the mid-1950s a number of them decided that inter-denominational and inter-organizational co-operation and fellowship was needed.  This desire on the part of both evangelical missionaries and Thai Christian leaders led to the formation of the Evangelical Fellowship of Thailand (EFT).  The EFT was formally recognized as a legal entity on June 19, 1969, and its first moderator was Rev. Suk Phongnoi.

Statistics 
As of 2018, it had 2,729 member local churches.

Affiliations 
The EFT is a member and active participant in the Thailand Protestant Churches Coordinating Committee, whose goal is to promote evangelism and discipleship among Protestant churches in Thailand.

References

External links 
 

National evangelical alliances
Protestantism in Thailand